Sir Thomas Stanhope (1540 – 3 August 1596) was the son and heir of Sir Michael Stanhope, and a Member of Parliament for Nottinghamshire.

Family
Thomas Stanhope was the eldest son of Sir Michael Stanhope and Anne Rawson (c.1515 – 20 February 1588), the daughter of Nicholas Rawson, of Aveley, Essex, and Beatrix Cooke (d. 14 January 1554), daughter of Sir Philip Cooke (d. 7 December 1503) and Elizabeth Belknap (died c. 6 March 1504),

He had six brothers and four sisters, as recorded in the inscription on his mother's monument in Shelford church:

Sir Edward Stanhope (c.1543–1603), a member of Queen Elizabeth's Council of the North. He married Susan Coleshill, the daughter and heir of Thomas Coleshill (d.1595), esquire, of Chigwell, Essex, inspector of customs for the City of London, by whom he had several sons and daughters, including a daughter who married Sir Percival Hart.
John Stanhope, 1st Baron Stanhope, Vice-Chamberlain of the Household, created Baron Stanhope of Harrington by King James. The title became extinct in 1675 with the death of his only son.
Edward Stanhope (c.1546–1608), Doctor of Civil Law and a Master of the Court of Chancery.
Sir Michael Stanhope of Sudbourne near Woodbridge, Suffolk, one of Queen Elizabeth's Gentlemen of the Privy Chamber. He was knighted in 1603 by King James. He married Elizabeth Read, the daughter of Sir William Read of Osterley, Middlesex, by whom he had two daughters and coheirs. There is a monument to him in Sudbourne church.
William Stanhope, who died an infant.
Edward Stanhope, who died an infant.
Eleanor Stanhope, who married Thomas Cooper of Thurgarton, Nottinghamshire.
Juliana Stanhope, who married John Hotham, esquire, of Scarborough, Yorkshire.
Jane Stanhope, who married firstly Sir Roger Townshend, and secondly, as his second wife, Henry Berkeley, 7th Baron Berkeley.
Margaret Stanhope, who died an infant.

Career
Stanhope was twelve years old when his father was executed in 1552. He lived at Shelford Priory Nottinghamshire.

In 1562 he was appointed Sheriff of Nottinghamshire and Derbyshire and in 1574 and 1587 High Sheriff of Nottinghamshire. In 1586 and 1593 he was elected knight of the shire (MP) for Nottinghamshire. He was knighted in 1575.

In 1596 he died in debt, partly caused by the cost of rebuilding Shelford Priory.

Marriage and issue
Stanhope married Margaret Port, the daughter of Sir John Port of Etwall and Cubley, Derbyshire, by Elizabeth Gifford.

Children: 
Sir John Stanhope (1559-1611), who married firstly, Cordell Alington, and secondly, Catherine Trentham.
Edward Stanhope.
Anne Stanhope (1576–1651), who married John Holles, 1st Earl of Clare (d.1637), the son of Denzel Holles (1538?–1590) and Eleanor Sheffield, daughter of Edmund Sheffield, 1st Baron Sheffield.

Notes

References

  

 

Sir Thomas Stanhope of Shelford, Local life in Elizabethan Times, Beryl Cobbing and Pamela Priestland

External links
Stanhope, Sir Thomas (c.1540-96) of Shelford, Nottinghamshire, History of Parliament Retrieved 31 March 2013
Will of Lady Margaret Stanhope, proved 14 April 1613, National Archives Retrieved 1 April 2013

1540 births
1596 deaths
People from Rushcliffe (district)
English MPs 1586–1587
High Sheriffs of Derbyshire
High Sheriffs of Nottinghamshire
Thomas